Ben Reynolds (born 26 September 1990) is an Irish athlete specialising in the sprint hurdles. He represented his country at the 2015 World Championships in Beijing without advancing from the first round. His personal bests are 13.48 seconds in the 110 metres hurdles (+0.8 m/s, Bedford 2015) and 7.73 seconds in the 60 metres hurdles (Athlone 2016).

Competition record

References

External links
Official website

1990 births
Living people
Male hurdlers from Northern Ireland
Irish male hurdlers
World Athletics Championships athletes for Ireland
Commonwealth Games competitors for Northern Ireland
Athletes (track and field) at the 2014 Commonwealth Games
Athletes (track and field) at the 2018 Commonwealth Games
People from Dundonald, County Down